Immaculate Heart of Mary Church in Pittsburgh, referred to in Polish as Kościół Matki Boskiej, is a historic church of the Catholic Diocese of Pittsburgh, one of the city's oldest and largest churches. Located on Polish Hill in Pittsburgh, Pennsylvania, it is a prime example of the so-called 'Polish Cathedral' style of churches in both its opulence and grand scale.

History
Immaculate Heart of Mary was founded in 1897 as a Polish ethnic parish. Beginning in 1885, Polish immigrants began settling on Herron Hill in Pittsburgh. Eventually so many immigrants settled there that the area was renamed Polish Hill. At first, the residents attended St. Stanislaus parish in the Strip District, but by 1895, the population of Polish Hill grew to the point that a committee of local citizens petitioned the bishop for their own parish. Permission was granted and the cornerstone of a combined church, school, and convent was laid in October 1896. The completed building was dedicated in August 1897.

The first floor of the building served as a school and the second floor served as the church. In 1899, the parish purchased land for a larger church. A prolific Akron, Ohio, architect William P. Ginther who specialized in ecclesiastical buildings designed the new structure, which was awarded a Pittsburgh Historic Landmark designation. The cornerstone was laid on July 31, 1904, and the completed church was dedicated on December 3, 1905. Like a number of other Polish churches in the so-called Polish Cathedral style such as St. Mary of the Angels in Chicago or St. Josaphat's Basilica in Milwaukee, the architectural plans for the church were intentionally modeled on St. Peter's Basilica in Rome. This church still serves the community of Polish Hill today.

This parish was the first in the United States of America to have the Divine Mercy Novena. They continue to have the novena and to have a very large celebration of Divine Mercy Sunday, the Sunday immediately after Easter Sunday.

Gallery

References

Roman Catholic Diocese of Pittsburgh
Roman Catholic churches in Pittsburgh
Roman Catholic churches in Pennsylvania
Pittsburgh History & Landmarks Foundation Historic Landmarks
Polish-American culture in Pittsburgh
Polish Cathedral style architecture
20th-century Roman Catholic church buildings in the United States
Roman Catholic churches completed in 1905